Karen L. Leach is an American biochemist with extensive drug discovery experience in large pharmaceutical research laboratories.  Her expertise in molecular pharmacology, signal transduction and protein kinases, has been used to establish mechanisms of toxicity for therapeutics such as the novel antibiotic linezolid (Zyvox).

Early life and education 
Born in Akron, Ohio to Glenn and Margaret Leach, she was the third of four daughters.  Leach graduated as valedictorian from  Revere High School in Richfield Ohio in 1973 and attended Ohio Wesleyan University, graduating magna cum laude with a BA in Biochemistry, in 1977.    In the laboratory of William B. Pratt at the University of Michigan, Leach did graduate research focused on the regulation of glucocorticoid hormone action and received her Ph. D. from the Department of Pharmacology in 1981.

Scientific contributions 
Leach continued her scientific research as a National Research Service Award Postdoctoral Fellow at the National Institutes of Health (NIH) where she studied the cancer-related phorbol estrogen receptor in the laboratory of Peter Blumberg.  Publications from the laboratory of Yasutomi Nishizuka on a newly discovered enzyme named protein kinase C (PKC) that was stimulated by phorbol ester led Leach to the realization that the phorbol estrogen receptor she was studying was in fact  PKC.  These fundamental discoveries in a burgeoning new field fueled Leach’s passion for kinases and in the broader field of signal transduction.

Leach moved on to research in the pharmaceutical industry (at The Upjohn Company, which became the Pharmacia Corp and eventually at Pfizer, Inc.)  where her expertise with  kinases and signal transduction launched her career, enabling her to lead discovery teams in the fields of oncology, Alzheimer Disease, and calcium signaling, leading to her application of these scientific insights to understanding of drug safety issues, particularly for the novel class of oxazolidinone antibiotics such as linezolid.  The approval of Zyvox to the antibiotic armentarium in 2000 was hailed as a much needed breakthrough in addressing the antibiotic resistance crisis. However safety concerns during prolonged usage in some patients highlighted a need for understanding the molecular basis of the toxicity in humans in order to design safer next- generation antibiotics.  Given the mechanism of action  for oxazolidinones as protein translation disruptors in bacterial pathogens and the bacterial ancestry of mitochondria, Leach began pursuing research into the hypothesis that the toxicity to human cells was linked to inhibition of mitochondrial protein synthesis.  Her lab  generated significant amounts of data implicating the role of mitochondrial protein synthesis inhibition in mammalian cellular toxicity.  Their conclusive experiment was the direct demonstration of the absence of oxazolidinone  toxicity in rho 0 cells, which contain mitochondria, but lack mitochondrial DNA and thus are unable to synthesize proteins.  By showing mitochondrial protein synthesis was the link to Zyvox cytotoxicity in human cells, this research led to  important advances in antibiotic safety and utilization of in vitro assays to predict in vivo toxicity.

Leach went on to conduct cross-disciplinary efforts within Pfizer using chemistry-cell biology approaches to predict safety issues in vitro, long before the drug leads were tested in animals. Her kinase expertise helped connect scientists across a wide array of therapeutic discovery efforts within Pfizer where she led a coordinated kinase safety effort across this large multinational corporation.  Tapping into her kinase expertise in drug discovery efforts, she  became a scientific liaison to the Division of Signal Transduction Therapy at the University of Dundee School of Life Sciences. Her research at Pfizer continued to focus on in vitro predictions of compound safety, for kinase inhibitors as well as other drug discovery candidates and therapeutic agents.

Leach’s scientific career included positions at increasing levels of Research Scientist levels, Associate Research Fellow,  and leader of several discovery teams before being named Director of Academic Research Collaborations at Pfizer’s Centers for Therapeutic Innovations in Boston, MA.  She now serves as an independent consultant, using her over 30 years of expertise to advise clients in various aspects of pharmaceutical discovery.

Professional activities 
2017–present  Member, Washington University Center for Drug Discovery External Advisory Committee

2012-2015     Pfizer scientific liaison, University of Dundee DSTT Consortium

2004-2006     Contributor, Zyvox World Wide Medical team oxazolidinone external research grant program

1994-2003     Adjunct Assistant Professor, Michigan State University, Biochemistry Department

2002-2003     Grant Reviewer, Washington University-Pharmacia Biomedical Grants

2001               Co-organizer, Signaling Symposium for MI Regional ACS meeting

1996-1998     Grant Reviewer, US Army Women’s Health Research Oncology Program

1996-1999     Advisor, Michigan State University-NIH Mass Spectrometry Advisory Committee

1990-1995     Grant reviewer, Michigan Heart Association Grant Review Committee

1990               Co-chair, Sixth International Symposium on Cellular Endocrinology

1990-1994     Associate editor, Journal of Immunology

Representative publications 

 Zhang X, Scialis RJ, Feng B, Leach K. Detection of statin cytotoxicity is increased in cells expressing the OATP1B1 transporter. Toxicol Sci. 2013;134(1):73‐82. \
 Leach, K.L., Swaney, S.M., Colca, J.R., McDonald, W.G., Blinn, J.R., Shinabarger, D., Xiong, L., Mankin, A. S. The site of action of oxazolidinone antibiotics in living bacteria and in human mitochondria. Molecular Cell 26: 393-402, 2007.
 Nagiec, Eva E.; Wu, Luping; Swaney, Steve M.; Chosay, John G.; Ross, Daniel E.; Brieland, Joan K.; Leach, Karen L.  Oxazolidinones inhibit cellular proliferation via inhibition of mitochondrial protein synthesis.  Antimicrobial Agents and Chemotherapy   49, 3896-3902, 2005.
 Clare, P.M, Poorman, R.A., Kelly, L.C., Watenpaugh, K.D., Leach, K.L. Cdk2 and cdk5 act by a random, uncompetitive kinetic mechanism. J. Biol. Chem. 276:48292-48299, 2001.
 Scott, J.E., Ruff, V.A., Leach, K.L.  Dynamic equilibrium between calcineurin and kinase activities regulates the phosphorylation state and localization of the nuclear factor of activated T-cells. Biochem. J. 324: 597-603, 1997
 Leach, K.L., Ruff, V.A., Jarpe, M.B., Adams, L.D., Fabbro, D., and Raben, D.M.  Alpha-Thrombin stimulates nuclear diglyceride levels and differential nuclear localization of protein kinase C isozymes in IIC9 cells. J. Biological Chemistry 267:21816-21822, 1992.
 Leach, K.L., Powers, E.A., Ruff, V.A., Jaken, S. and Kaufmann, S.  Type 3 protein kinase C localization to the nuclear envelope of phorbol ester-treated NIH 3T3 cells.  J. Cell. Biol., 109:685-695, 1989.
 Leach, K.L. and Blumberg, P.M.  Modulation of protein kinase C activity and [3H] phorbol 12,13-dibutyrate binding by various tumor promoters.  Cancer Res., 45:1958-1963, 1985.
 Leach, K.L., James, M.L. and Blumberg, P.M.  Characterization of a specific phorbol ester apo-receptor in mouse brain cytosol. Proc. Natl. Acad. Sci. USA, 80:4208-4212,1983. 
 Leach, K.L., Grippo, J.F., Housley, P.R., Dahmer, M.K., Salive, M.E. and Pratt, W.B. Characteristics of an endogenous glucocorticoid receptor stabilizing factor.  J. Biol. Chem., 257:381-388, 1982

References 

American biochemists
People from Akron, Ohio
Ohio Wesleyan University alumni
Year of birth missing (living people)
Living people
American women scientists
University of Michigan alumni
21st-century American women